Slickstones Quarry, Cromhall is a 2.7 hectare geological Site of Special Scientific Interest near the village of Cromhall, South Gloucestershire, England notified in 1966.

The site shows red Triassic rocks in fissures of older carboniferous limestone.

The quarry is home to South West Maritime Academy, offering both Diving and Open Water Swimming in the 4 hectare quarry lake as well as a broader site use for commercial maritime safety training by the Academy including STCW, STCW Update, marine engineering and deckhand courses as well as various RYA course offerings. The lake can be used by diving trainees as there is a sloping entry (former road) and a pontoon which is also used as an entry point for the swimmers.

References

Geology of Gloucestershire
Quarries in Gloucestershire
Sites of Special Scientific Interest in Avon
Sites of Special Scientific Interest notified in 1966
Diving quarries in the United Kingdom
Lakes of Gloucestershire